Charles Augustus Rosenheimer Campbell Sr., M.D. (December 29, 1863 – February 22, 1931) was president of the San Antonio Academy of Medicine and bacteriologist for San Antonio, Texas. His medical interests in mosquitoes as disease vectors led him to appreciate bats as a way to reduce mosquito populations.

Biography
He was born on December 29, 1863, in San Antonio, Texas to Martin Hifield Campbell (1824–1874) and Dolores Barrera (1829–1890). He attended Tulane University and received an M.D. He married Ida Hoyer (1864-1926), and they had three children, Julius R. Campbell (1886–1887), Charles Augustus Rosenheimer Campbell Jr. (1889–1911), and Milton Francis Campbell (1892–1942). In 1925 he published Bats, Mosquitoes, and Dollars. He died on February 22, 1931, in San Antonio, Texas.

Publications

Bats, Mosquitoes, and Dollars (1925)

References

External links

 http://www.batcon.org/resources/media-education/bats-magazine/bat_article/386

1863 births
1931 deaths
American bacteriologists
Physicians from Texas
Tulane University alumni
19th-century American physicians
20th-century American physicians